Borgo Velino is a  (municipality) in the Province of Rieti in the region of Latium, Italy. Until 1927 Borgo Velino was part of the province of L'Aquila in Abruzzo. It is located near the site of a pre- or early-Roman Sabine village named Viario. Rare ruins of this ancient village, now occupied by a cultivated field, were found near a standing medieval tower. Borgo Velino is the birthplace of Giulio Pezzola, a notorious outlaw of the 17th century.

Borgo Velino borders the following municipalities: Antrodoco, Castel Sant'Angelo, Cittaducale, Fiamignano, Micigliano, Petrella Salto.

Transport 
Borgo Velino has a station on the Terni–Sulmona railway, with trains to Terni, Rieti and L'Aquila.

References

Cities and towns in Lazio